

The MSrE M-24 was a sport aircraft built in Hungary in the late 1930s. It was a low-wing cantilever monoplane of conventional design, with a wing of elliptical planform. The pilot and single passenger sat in tandem under a canopy that fully enclosed the cockpit and the main wheels of the tailwheel undercarriage were retractable. A small series of five aircraft was produced, with the first two supplied to Egypt.

Operators

Royal Egyptian Air Force

Specifications

Notes

References

 
 
 

1930s Hungarian sport aircraft
MSrE aircraft
Low-wing aircraft
Single-engined tractor aircraft
Aircraft first flown in 1938